Dénes Pázmándy may refer to:
 Dénes Pázmándy (1781–1854), Hungarian landowner and politician
 Dénes Pázmándy (1816–1856), Hungarian landowner and politician, who served as Speaker of the House of Representatives
 Dénes Pázmándy (1848–1936), Hungarian nationalist journalist and politician, member of the Independence Party of 48